Baseball was contested at the 2015 Summer Universiade from July 6 to 11 in Gwangju, South Korea. The tournament was only for men.

Medal summary

Medal table

Medal events

Men
Eight teams participated in the men's tournament.

Teams

Pool A

Pool B

Group stage

Pool A

|}

Pool B

|}

Final Stage

5th ~ 8th Place

1st ~ 4th Place

Final standing

References

External links
Official Games site

2015
2015 Summer Universiade events
2015 in baseball